David Beneteau (born June 22, 1967) is a Canadian former mixed martial artist and freestyle wrestler who is best known for his appearances in Ultimate Fighting Championship at UFC 5, 6, 15 and, Ultimate Ultimate 1995.

Toward the end of his mixed martial arts career, Beneteau also performed professional wrestling matches for New Japan Pro-Wrestling and other promotions in Japan and Canada.

'Dangerous' Dave Beneteau retired from mixed martial arts to attend law school in 2002. He was admitted to the bar in 2003 and practiced primarily as a criminal defense lawyer under the tutelage of renowned Toronto defence lawyer, John Rosen, until 2007. In 2015, Beneteau earned a Master of Laws from Osgoode Hall Law School and is now a General Counsel for Movati Athletics in the Greater Toronto Area.

Mixed martial arts career

Ultimate Fighting Championship
Beneteau debuted in the Ultimate Fighting Championship at its UFC 5 event in April 1995. He was billed as a Wrestler with experience and success in Judo. He finished his first opponent, Kung Fu practitioner Asbel Cancio, in only 21 seconds, needing just a takedown and a flurry of quick ground and pound to do so. Beneteau then faced Jeet Kune Do expert Todd Medina and defeated him in very much the same way, and then reached the finals, where he was pitted against wrestling champion and future hall-of-famer Dan Severn. The fight was hard-fought but short, with Severn tripping Beneteau down from the clinch and locking a keylock for the win.

Dave returned in UFC 6, where he faced former Russian Sambo champion Oleg Taktarov in the first round. Beneteau initiated the match with heavy punches and an early takedown, but Taktarov caught Beneteau in a guillotine choke for the win. Beneteau's dynamic style and skill earned him passage to one of the UFC's first tournament of champions, the Ultimate Ultimate 1995, which granted him a highly anticipated rematch against Taktarov. Beneteau lost again by way of an inverted rolling ankle lock.

Brazil and Japan
After his first UFC tenure, Beneteau made an appearance in Brazilian promotion Universal Vale Tudo Fighting, entering its UVF 4 tournament. Other decorated wrestlers with connections to UFC participated, among them Kevin Randleman and Dan Bobish. In the first round, Beneteau faced famed Brazilian boxer, Egidio "Sombra da Noite" Amaro da Costa, and made short work of him, taking down and submitting Amaro by keylock. The Canadian then advanced to fight the 50 pounds heavier Bobish, who controlled the bout with a guillotine choke with several strikes until getting the win by a cut.

Beneteau then travelled to Japan, where he defeated UFC II Tournament runner-up Patrick Smith in under a minute.

Return to UFC
Beneteau made his final UFC appearance in 1997, where he faced the Carlson Gracie apprentice and world heavyweight Brazilian jiu-jitsu champion Carlos Barreto. The latter was a heavy favorite entering the bout, having won the UVF 4 tournament and coming with a 7-0 record. Accordingly, Beneteau was in heavy danger at the beginning of the fight, as Barreto took his back and landed strikes to the back of his head while pursuing a rear naked choke, but the Canadian managed to escape and returned the favor via ground and pound against the fence. Due to this, Barreto changed his strategy and hit Beneteau with punches and kicks, but Beneteau executed a takedown and kept hitting with heavy hands through the Brazilian's guard. After several strikes scored, Beneteau was declared the winner by the judges' decision.

Professional wrestling career
While training with Dan Severn in Coldwater, Michigan, and during a meeting in Severn's office, New Japan Pro-Wrestling called looking to book Severn for a tournament in Osaka. Since Severn was already booked that weekend, he suggested Beneteau could do the booking for him. Beneteau agreed and Severn trained him in the basics of pro wrestling so that he could perform for New Japan.

Beneteau then began to work with Don Frye and Brian Johnson in New Japan under the Club 245 stable which was named after the State of California criminal code for assault and bodily harm. Dave participated in a lot of tag team matches with Frye and even had singles matches with Yuji Nagata, Yoji Anjo and Naoya Ogawa.

Beneteau also did some work with Scott D'Amore's Border City Wrestling and Antonio Inoki's Universal Fighting Arts Organization (UFO).

Championships and accomplishments 
Canadian Juvenile Freestyle Wrestling Champion, 1984
Canadian Juvenile Freestyle Wrestling Champion, 1985
Canadian Junior Freestyle Wrestling Champion, 1986
United States Junior Freestyle Wrestling, Bronze Medalist, 1986
Canadian Junior Freestyle Wrestling Champion, 1987
United States Junior Freestyle Wrestling Champion, 1987

Mixed martial arts record

|-
| Loss
| align=center| 6–5–1
| Tim Catalfo
| Submission (choke)
| KOTC 9 - Showtime
| 
| align=center| 1
| align=center| 0:25
| San Jacinto, California, U.S.
| 
|-
| Win
| align=center| 6–4–1
| Joe Campanella
| Submission (keylock)
| UCC 2: The Moment of Truth
| 
| align=center| 1
| align=center| 1:06
| Montreal, Quebec, Canada
| 
|-
| Draw
| align=center| 5–4–1
| Elvis Sinosic
| Draw
| UCC 1: The New Beginning
| 
| align=center| 2
| align=center| 10:00
| Montreal, Quebec, Canada
| 
|-
| Win
| align=center| 5–4
| Carlos Barreto
| Decision (unanimous)
| UFC 15
| 
| align=center| 1
| align=center| 15:00
| Bay St. Louis, Mississippi, U.S.
| 
|-
| Win
| align=center| 4–4
| Patrick Smith
| TKO (submission to punches)
| U - Japan
| 
| align=center| 1
| align=center| 1:09
| Sapporo, Japan
| 
|-
| Loss
| align=center| 3–4
| Dan Bobish
| TKO (cut)
| rowspan=2|Universal Vale Tudo Fighting 4
| rowspan=2|
| align=center| 1
| align=center| 4:44
| Brazil
| 
|-
| Win
| align=center| 3–3
| Egidio Amaro da Costa
| Submission (keylock)
| align=center| 1
| align=center| 2:36
| Brazil
| 
|-
| Loss
| align=center| 2–3
| Oleg Taktarov
| Submission (Achilles hold)
| Ultimate Ultimate 1995
| 
| align=center| 1
| align=center| 1:15
| Denver, Colorado, U.S.
| 
|-
| Loss
| align=center| 2–2
| Oleg Taktarov
| Submission (guillotine choke)
| UFC 6
| 
| align=center| 1
| align=center| 0:57
| Casper, Wyoming, U.S.
| 
|-
| Loss
| align=center| 2–1
| Dan Severn
| Submission (keylock)
| rowspan=3|UFC 5
| rowspan=3|
| align=center| 1
| align=center| 3:01
| rowspan=3|Charlotte, North Carolina, U.S.
| 
|-
| Win
| align=center| 2–0
| Todd Medina
| TKO (punches)
| align=center| 1
| align=center| 2:12
| 
|-
| Win
| align=center| 1–0
| Asbel Cancio
| TKO (punches)
| align=center| 1
| align=center| 0:21
|

References

External links

 

1968 births
Living people
Canadian male mixed martial artists
Heavyweight mixed martial artists
Mixed martial artists utilizing freestyle wrestling
Mixed martial artists utilizing judo
Sportspeople from Windsor, Ontario
Ultimate Fighting Championship male fighters
Canadian male sport wrestlers
Canadian male judoka